"Sal de Mi Piel" (English: "Get Out of My Skin"), is a song by Belinda.

Background 
The song released airplay on August 17 and digitally on August 18, 2009 included on her third studio album Carpe Diem. The song is written by herself used as main-theme from Mexican telenovela Camaleones starring herself and Alfonso Herrera.

"Sal de Mi Piel" was produced by Áureo Baqueiro and it was originally written for RBD, and finally the producers decided that Belinda should sing the song because she wrote it.

Track listing 
iTunes Digital download
"Sal De Mi Piel" (Belinda Peregrín) – 3:29

Chart performance 
It debuted at number 36, and peaked at number 31 on the U.S. Billboard Latin Pop Songs.

References

External links 
BelindaOnline.com — Belinda Official Site

Belinda Peregrín songs
Pop ballads
Songs written by Belinda Peregrín
2009 singles
2009 songs
EMI Televisa Music singles
Song recordings produced by Áureo Baqueiro